The bacon and egg pie is a savoury pie consisting of a crust containing bacon, egg and sometimes onion, mushrooms, bell peppers, peas, tomato, fresh herbs and cheese. It is popular in New Zealand. However, bacon and egg pie originated during the middle ages in Cornwall and is still a popular pie cooked in Cornish homes today (although rarely found in Cornish bakeries). For many Cornish people, a bacon and egg pie is more of a taste of home than the famous Cornish pasty.  Bacon and egg pie may be served with ketchup, which can be combined with Worcestershire sauce and drizzled over the filling before the pie is baked and some versions have a rising agent such as baking powder mixed into the egg to make a fluffier filling.

Composition
The pie is often constructed with shortcrust pastry or other stable base crust. The crust is usually topped with a pastry lid, but is sometimes left open. 

A bacon and egg pie differs from a quiche, most notably due to the absence of cheese and milk and the presence of an upper crust. Also the eggs are not beaten and are whole, or at the most yolks pierced. The pie also tends to have a heavier texture and feel, and is generally high in calories.

Although the bacon and egg combination is not unique to any country, its use in modern cooking is notable in New Zealand, Canada and Australia. Recipes for it have been found as early as The Experienced English Housekeeper in 1769.

See also

 Cornish pasty
 List of pies, tarts and flans
 Quiche
 Steak and kidney pie

References

Bacon dishes
British pies
English cuisine
New Zealand pies
Savoury pies
Australian pies
National dishes
Egg dishes